Janne Pöyhönen, better known by his stage name Raappana, is a Finnish reggae artist from Lahti.

Career

Raappana's first studio album Päivä on nuori was released on 3 October 2007. It peaked at number 18 on the Finnish Album Chart. His second studio album Maapallo, released on 1 September 2010, peaked at number one on the same chart. On 22 March 2013, he released his third studio album Tuuliajolla which reached number five on the album chart.

Raappana also appeared as a featured guest on a song "Kran Turismo" by JVG. The song spent 12 weeks at number one on the Finnish Singles Chart.

Discography

Albums

Others
2010: Ilta on nuori (Remix album)

Singles
"Sensimilla/Lintsari Anthem Remix 7"
"Perhesuhteet"
"Paha on sanoa

featured in

References

External links

 Raappana on Myspace

Finnish reggae musicians
People from Lahti
Living people
Year of birth missing (living people)